Rufus NkereAwaji Godwins is a lawyer and civil servant in Rivers State, Nigeria. He is the current Head of Service under the administration of Governor Ezenwo Wike. Prior to his appointment, he had served as the Director of Public Prosecutions in Rivers State. He went on to serve as Permanent Secretary of Rivers State Ministry of Environment and as Solicitor-General & Permanent Secretary of the Rivers State Ministry of Justice.

See also
List of people from Rivers State

References

Living people
Rivers State civil servants
Rivers State lawyers
First Wike Executive Council
Year of birth missing (living people)